Hjálmar is an Icelandic reggae band formed in 2004  in Keflavík.

Collaborations
On June 2, 2012, at the concert Hljómskálinn á Listahátíð Hjálmar performed with Jimi Tenor. When he introduced Tenor, Guðmundur Kristinn Jónsson said that Hjálmar are currently recording an album with him. The album was eventually released in 2013 titled Dub of Doom and was credited to Jimi Tenor og Hjálmar.

Members

Current 
Þorsteinn Einarsson - Guitar and vocals
Sigurður Halldór Guðmundsson - Keyboards and vocals
Guðmundur Kristinn Jónsson - Guitar
 Valdimar Kolbeinn Sigurjónsson (2007–present) - Bass
 Helgi Svavar Helgason (2007–present) - Percussion

Former 
 Kristinn Snær Agnarsson (2004-2005)
 Micke "PB" Svensson (2005-2007)
 Nils Olof Törnqvist (2005-2007)
 Petter Winnberg (2004-2007)

Discography

Albums
2004: Hljóðlega af stað 
2005: Hjálmar 
2007: Ferðasót
2009: IV 
2010: Keflavík Kingston
2011: Órar

Collaborations
2013:  Dub of Doom (Jimi Tenor og Hjálmar)
2014: Legao (Erlend Øye)

Compilations
2014: Skýjaborgin 2004-2014

Singles
2006: "Saga úr sveitinni"
2008: "Dom hinner aldrig ikapp" (with Timbuktu)
2010: "Blómin í brekkunni"
2010: "Gakktu alla leið"
2011: "Messenger of Bad News" (with Jimmy Tenor)
2011: "Í gegnum móðuna"
2011: "Ég teikna stjörnu"
2013: "Skýjaborgin"
2014: "Lof"
2014: "Ferðasót"
2014: "Leiðin okkar allra"
2014: "Tilvonandi vor"
2015: "Undir Fót"
2015: "Hlauptu Hratt"
2016: "Er Hann Birtist" (with Mr. Silla)
2016: "Allt er Eitt"
2017: "Græðgin"
2017: "Glugginn"
2018: "Hættur að anda"

References

Icelandic reggae musical groups
Musical groups established in 2004
Keflavík